Zuzana Šulajová (or Zuzana Šulaj, pronunciation: shoo-lah-yo-vah) (born 14 July 1978, Martin, Czechoslovakia) is a Slovak stage, television and film actress.

Biography
Zuzana Šulajová is a daughter of writer and pedagogue Ondřej Šulaj and actress Anna Šulajová. She is a photographer and actress. She studied Photography at the Academy of Art and Industrial Design (UMPRUM) in Prague. Her sister Katarína Šulajová is a director.

Filmography
Wrong Side Up / Příběhy obyčejného šílenštví (2005) .... Jana
O dve slabiky pozadu (2004) .... Zuzana
Zpráva o putování studentů Petra a Jakuba (2000) .... Eva
Powers (2000)
The Garden (1995) .... Helena - Czech Lion award - nomination
Tichá radosť (1985) .... Katka Galová

Videoclips and commercials
Hex by Juraj Černý (1995)
Support Lesbiens (2004)
Eurotel Easy (2002) directed by Vlado Struhár
Kofola Citrus (2004) directed by Michal Baumbrucken

References

1978 births
Living people
People from Martin, Slovakia
21st-century Slovak actresses
Slovak photographers
Slovak women photographers
Slovak film actresses
Slovak television actresses
20th-century Slovak actresses
Academy of Arts, Architecture and Design in Prague alumni